Mario Novelli (born 12 October 1913, date of death unknown) was an Italian basketball player. He competed in the 1936 Summer Olympics.

References

1913 births
Year of death missing
Italian men's basketball players
Olympic basketball players of Italy
Basketball players at the 1936 Summer Olympics
Sportspeople from Pula
Istrian Italian people
People from Austrian Littoral
Italian Austro-Hungarians